Eaton's reagent (10 wt% phosphorus pentoxide solution in methanesulfonic acid) is used as an alternative to polyphosphoric acid in chemical synthesis to promote acylation reactions.

References

Phosphorus compounds